Lake Arrowhead is a census-designated place (CDP) in the towns of Waterboro and Limerick in York County, Maine, United States. The population was 3,071 at the 2010 census. The CDP corresponds to the area covered by the Lake Arrowhead Community, a large subdivision begun in the 1960s which surrounds Lake Arrowhead, an artificial lake on the Little Ossipee River. The community is part of the Portland–South Portland–Biddeford, Maine Metropolitan Statistical Area.

Geography
Lake Arrowhead is located at  (43.661341, -70.738348).

Climate
This climatic region is typified by large seasonal temperature differences, with warm to hot (and often humid) summers and cold (sometimes severely cold) winters.  According to the Köppen Climate Classification system, Lake Arrowhead has a humid continental climate, abbreviated "Dfb" on climate maps.

Demographics

As of the census of 2000, there were 2,264 people, 746 households, and 610 families residing in the CDP. The racial makeup of the CDP was 98.50% White, 0.04% African American, 0.31% Native American, 0.09% Asian, 0.22% from other races, and 0.84% from two or more races. Hispanic or Latino of any race were 1.02% of the population.

There were 746 households, out of which 53.5% had children under the age of 18 living with them, 70.5% were married couples living together, 7.5% had a female householder with no husband present, and 18.1% were non-families. 9.5% of all households were made up of individuals, and 1.7% had someone living alone who was 65 years of age or older. The average household size was 3.03 and the average family size was 3.28.

In the CDP, the population was spread out, with 35.1% under the age of 18, 6.2% from 18 to 24, 42.2% from 25 to 44, 12.9% from 45 to 64, and 3.6% who were 65 years of age or older. The median age was 30 years. For every 100 females, there were 102.1 males. For every 100 females age 18 and over, there were 97.1 males.

The median income for a household in the CDP was $46,818, and the median income for a family was $46,509. Males had a median income of $39,205 versus $24,083 for females. The per capita income for the CDP was $16,588. About 4.9% of families and 6.7% of the population were below the poverty line, including 10.5% of those under age 18 and none of those age 65 or over.

2012 earthquake
On October 16, 2012, at approximately 7:12 PM EDT, an earthquake with a moment magnitude of 4.0 was felt with a maximum Mercalli intensity of VI (Strong). The earthquake was felt in many parts of eastern New England, and as far south as Long Island, NY.

References

External links
 Town of Waterboro, Maine
 Waterboro Public Library
 Lake Arrowhead Community, inc.

Census-designated places in Maine
Portland metropolitan area, Maine
Census-designated places in York County, Maine
Waterboro, Maine
Limerick, Maine